Henri Gabriel Putz (Metz, 26 January 1859 – Metz, 22 February 1925) was a French Army general during World War I.

Early years

He was born in Metz in 1859 as the son of military Jean-Baptiste Henry Putz (1824–1903), who became Brigade General in 1881 and Commander of the Légion d'honneur. When Metz became German after the Franco-German War, the Putz family applied for French citizenship. Despite being of German descent, they preferred to be French.
Henri studied at the École Polytechnique where he left in 1879 as 6th of his class, and opted for the artillery.

He fought against Tunisian insurgents in 1881–1882. Later he was stationed in Asia, where he participated in the Tonkin Campaign (1885–1887). He also fought in the Madagascar expedition (1896–1899) and the suppression of the Boxer Rebellion (1900–1901).

World War I 

At the outbreak of World War I, as a Division general he received command of the 28th Infantry Division, which was part of the First Army under Auguste Dubail.
His division saw heavy fighting during August 1914 in the Battle of the Vosges. When the focus of the fighting moved west towards the Marne, Henri Putz was appointed on 7 September  as commander of the Groupement des Vosges, later renamed Army Detachment of the Vosges and 34th Army Corps.
On 2 April 1915, he was put at the head of the Army Detachment in Belgium, which defended the northern part of the Ypres Salient. It was here that, on 22 April 1915, the Germans launched their surprise gas-attack, starting the Second Battle of Ypres.

Between 17 June 1915 and 19 December 1917 he commanded the 4th Army Corps, which fought on the Argonne, Aisne and Somme. From 23 December 1917 to 19 April 1918, he was head of the Commandement supérieur du Nord.
  
After the War, he moved to his hometown Metz again and died here in 1925. He was buried at Les Invalides. On 20 July 1920 he had become Grand officer of the Légion d'honneur.

References

   

1859 births
1925 deaths
Military personnel from Metz
French military personnel of World War I
French generals
Grand Officiers of the Légion d'honneur